Peter Damm (born 27 July 1937, Meiningen, Thüringen) is a German horn player.

He began his musical education aged eleven, on the violin, and started playing the horn in 1951 and graduated from the Franz Liszt Academy in 1957.  In 1959 he was appointed as principal horn of the Leipzig Gewandhaus Orchestra, and from 1969 to 2002 he was principal horn at the Dresden Staatskapelle. On his retiring, the orchestra made him an honorary member.  He is professor of horn at the Carl Maria von Weber music conservatoire (Hochschule für Musik) in Dresden.

He was awarded the title "Kammermusiker" in 1969, and "Kammervirtuose" in 1971.

His professional career saw him touring extensively in Europe, as well as Japan and North America.  He has also given many masterclasses and seminars.
Peter Damm performed the Richard Strauss Hornkonzert Op.11 over 150 times.

Since 1986, Peter Damm has been president of the International Competition for Wind Instruments in Markneukirchen. He is an honorary member of the International Horn Society.

Damm has been described as "legendary" – he is known for both his exceptional abilities as a player, and for his editions of many of the standard works in the horn repertoire, published by Breitkopf.  In particular, his recordings of Strauss with the Staatskapelle Dresden are still in demand.

References

 Official website
 Peter Damm at the International Horn Society

1937 births
Living people
German classical horn players
Artists from Meiningen
Academic staff of the Hochschule für Musik Carl Maria von Weber
Recipients of the Art Prize of the German Democratic Republic